The Bureau of Reclamation, and formerly the United States Reclamation Service, is a federal agency under the U.S. Department of the Interior, which oversees water resource management, specifically as it applies to the oversight and operation of the diversion, delivery, and storage projects that it has built throughout the western United States for irrigation, water supply, and attendant hydroelectric power generation. Currently the Bureau of Reclamation is the largest wholesaler of water in the country, bringing water to more than 31 million people, and providing one in five Western farmers with irrigation water for 10 million acres of farmland, which produce 60% of the nation's vegetables and 25% of its fruits and nuts. The Bureau of Reclamation is also the second largest producer of hydroelectric power in the western United States.

On June 17, 1902, in accordance with the Reclamation Act, Secretary of the Interior Ethan Allen Hitchcock established the U.S. Reclamation Service within the U.S. Geological Survey (USGS). The new Reclamation Service studied potential water development projects in each western state with federal lands—revenue from sale of federal lands was the initial source of the program's funding. Because Texas had no federal lands, it did not become a Reclamation state until 1906, when Congress passed a law including it in the provisions of the Reclamation Act.

History 

From 1902 to 1907, Reclamation began about 30 projects in Western states. Then, in 1907, the Secretary of the Interior separated the Reclamation Service from the USGS and created an independent bureau within the Department of the Interior. Frederick Haynes Newell was appointed the first director of the new bureau. Beginning with the third person to take over the direction of Reclamation in 1923, David W. Davis, the title was changed from Director to Commissioner.

In the early years, many projects encountered problems: lands or soils included in projects were unsuitable for irrigation; land speculation sometimes resulted in poor settlement patterns; proposed repayment schedules could not be met by irrigators who had high land-preparation and facilities-construction costs; settlers were inexperienced in irrigation farming; waterlogging of irrigable lands required expensive drainage projects; and projects were built in areas which could only grow low-value crops. In 1923 the agency was renamed the "Bureau of Reclamation". In 1924, however, in the face of increasing settler unrest and financial woes, the "Fact Finder's Report" spotlighted major problematic issues; the Fact Finders Act in late 1924 sought to resolve some of these problems.

In 1928 Congress authorized the Boulder Canyon (Hoover Dam) Project, and large appropriations began, for the first time, to flow to Reclamation from the general funds of the United States. The authorization came only after a hard-fought debate about the pros and cons of public power versus private power.

The heyday of Reclamation construction of water facilities occurred during the Depression and the 35 years after World War II. From 1941 to 1947, Civilian Public Service labor was used to carry on projects otherwise interrupted by the war effort. The last major authorization for construction projects occurred in the late 1960s, while a parallel evolution and development of the American environmental movement began to result in strong opposition to water development projects. Even the 1976 failure of Teton Dam as it filled for the first time did not diminish Reclamation's strong international reputation in water development circles. However, this first and only failure of a major Reclamation Bureau dam led to subsequent strengthening of its dam-safety program to avoid similar problems. Even so, the failure of Teton Dam, the environmental movement, and the announcement of President Carter's "hit list" on water projects profoundly affected the direction of Reclamation's programs and activities.

Reclamation operates about 180 projects in the 17 western states. The total Reclamation investment for completed project facilities in September 1992 was about $11 billion. Reclamation projects provide agricultural, household, and industrial water to about one‑third of the population of the American West. About 5% of the land area of the West is irrigated, and Reclamation provides water to about one-fifth of that area, some 9,120,000 acres (37,000 km2) in 1992. Reclamation is a major American generator of electricity. , Reclamation had 58 power plants on‑line and generated 125,000 GJ of electricity.

From 1988 to 1994, Reclamation underwent major reorganization as construction on projects authorized in the 1960s and earlier drew to an end. Reclamation wrote that "The arid West essentially has been reclaimed. The major rivers have been harnessed and facilities are in place or are being completed to meet the most pressing current water demands and those of the immediate future". Emphasis in Reclamation programs shifted from construction to operation and maintenance of existing facilities. Reclamation's redefined official mission is to "manage, develop, and protect water and related resources in an environmentally and economically sound manner in the interest of the American public". In redirecting its programs and responsibilities, Reclamation substantially reduced its staff levels and budgets but remains a significant federal agency in the West.

On October 1, 2017, the Hoover Dam Police Department was closed and the National Park Service took over law enforcement duties for the Hoover Dam. The Hoover Dam Police Department existed for more than 80 years.

Leadership
Reclamation commissioners that have had a strong impact and molding of the Bureau have included Elwood Mead, Michael W. Straus, and Floyd Dominy, with the latter two being public-power boosters who ran the Bureau during its heyday. Mead guided the bureau during the development, planning, and construction of the Hoover Dam, the United States' first multiple-purpose dam.

John W. Keys, the 16th Commissioner of the Bureau of Reclamation who served from July 2001 to April 2006, was killed two years after his retirement on May 30, 2008, when the airplane he was piloting crashed in Canyonlands National Park, Utah.

On June 26, 2017, President Donald Trump nominated Brenda Burman to serve as the Commissioner of the United States Bureau of Reclamation. She was confirmed by the United States Senate on November 16, 2017. Burman is the first woman to ever lead the Bureau of Reclamation. David Murillo was serving as the acting commissioner of the bureau. Burman resigned on January 20 after the inauguration of the Biden Administration.

The current Commissioner is Camille Calimlim Touton, the first Filipino American to head the agency. She was confirmed by the United States Senate on November 4, 2021.

List of reclamation projects 

 Animas-La Plata Water Project
 Boise Project
 Central Arizona Project Aqueduct
 Central Utah Project
 Central Valley Project
 Colorado-Big Thompson Project
 Colorado River Storage Project
 Columbia Basin Project
 Elwha River Dam Removal Project
 Fryingpan-Arkansas Project
 High Plains Cooperative Pilot Project
 Huntley Project
 Klamath Project
 Minidoka Project
 Moon Lake Project
 Navajo-Gallup Water Supply Project
 North Platte Project
 Pojoaque Basin Regional Water System Project
 Project Skywater
 Rio Grande Project
 Shoshone Project
 Sierra Cooperative Pilot Project
 Strawberry Valley Project
 Washita Basin Project
 Yuma Project

See also 
 Colorado River Aqueduct
 Desert Terminal Lakes Program
 Grand Coulee Dam
 List of United States Bureau of Reclamation dams
 Refuge Water Supply Program
 Riverside Canal (El Paso)
 Yuma Valley Railway, a predecessor of the Yuma Valley Railroad that was owned by USG along Colorado River in Yuma, Arizona

References

Further reading 
 Börk, Karrigan S., "'The Wilderness and the Dry Land Will Be Glad; and the Desert Will Rejoice and Blossom like a Rose': The Origins of the Bureau of Reclamation," Journal of the West 50 (Spring 2011), 60–74.
 Marc Reisner, Cadillac Desert: The American West and Its Disappearing Water. Revised edition (Penguin, 1993). .
 Christopher Sneddon, Concrete Revolution: Large Dams, Cold War Geopolitics, and the US Bureau of Reclamation, 2015, University of Chicago Press
 Daniel P. Beard Deadbeat Dams: Why We Should Abolish the U.S. Bureau of Reclamation and Tear Down Glen Canyon Dam, (Johnson Books, 2015).

External links 

 Bureau of Reclamation in the Federal Register
 List of Reclamation projects, dams and powerplants
 List of Commissioners
 Bureau that Changed the West Documentary produced by Idaho Public Television

 
Government agencies established in 1902
Bureau of Reclamation
Water management authorities in the United States
Reclamation
1902 establishments in Washington, D.C.